Jonas Gunnarsson (born March 31, 1992) is a Swedish professional ice hockey goaltender. He currently plays for HV71 in the Swedish Hockey League (SHL). He has previously played with the Malmö Redhawks and the Milwaukee Admirals.

Playing career 
Gunnarsson logged his first minutes in the Swedish Hockey League (SHL) with HV71 during the 2011–12 season. To gain more playing time, he moved to second-division side Malmö Redhawks in 2014 and helped the team earn promotion to the SHL. In the 2015–16 SHL campaign, he made 44 SHL appearances with a goals against average of 2.47 and a save percentage of .913.

On June 1, 2016, he was handed a one-year entry-level contract by the Nashville Predators of the National Hockey League (NHL).

References

External links

1992 births
Living people
HV71 players
Malmö Redhawks players
Milwaukee Admirals players
Swedish ice hockey goaltenders
IF Troja/Ljungby players